Al Muraqqabat, sometimes spelled Al Muraqabat, is a locality in Dubai, United Arab Emirates (UAE). Located in the heart of eastern Dubai in Deira, Al Muraqqabat is bordered by the localities of Al Rigga, Al Muteena and Al Khabisi.

Although a predominantly residential area, Al Muraqqabat also has many shopping malls, hotels and restaurants. As a residential area, Al Muraqqabat has the third-highest population density in the city of Dubai (after Ayil Nasir and Naif). The locality is bounded to the north by route D 88 (Omar bin Khattab Road) and to the south by route E 11 (Abu Baker Al Siddique Road). Al Muraqqabat Road divides the locality into two sub-sections, the western flank of which is primarily residential, while the eastern flank is more commercial, with banks, hotels and restaurants located in it. 

Fish Roundabout, located at the northwestern periphery of Al Muraqqabat is an important landmark in Deira. Additionally, other landmarks in the locality include Al Ghurair City, Hamarain Centre, Warba Centre, JW Marriott, Al Muraqqabat Police Station, the head offices of Mashreq Bank and Al-Futtaim Group, Ansar gallery departmental store and Reef mall. There are famous restaurants like Samad Iraqi, Aroos Damascus and Al Shami Lebanese, Bait al Mandi Yemeni, Puranmal Indian veg, Gulf pastry Arabic pizza, and some Arabic sweets shop, Domino's Pizza.

Like many parts of Deira, Al Muraqqabat is a primarily South Asian community. The locality follows a grid plan, with even-numbered streets running northwest–southeast through the locality, starting with 2nd Street, near route D 80 (Salahuddin Road) and ending with 30 Road (Al Rigga Road). Odd numbered streets run perpendicular to even-numbered streets in a southwest–northeast direction, beginning with 1st Street in the northern periphery of the locality (near Fish Roundabout), and ending with 45th Street (near Hamarain Centre and route D 78). Al Rigga is a twin locality of Al Muraqqabat as the grid system of local roads from Al Muraqqabat continues to progress into Al Rigga.  Al Rigga is parallel to Al Murraqabat and Al Rigga. Al Rigga is  important centre of entertainment and shopping during the Dubai Shopping Festival (DSF).  Al Rigga Road, which separates Al Rigga from Al Muraqqabat, typically hosts kiosks in retail outlets and children's entertainment park, during DSF and Dubai Summer Surprises.

References 

Communities in Dubai